Judy Weis may refer to 
Judith Weis, an American scientist
Jessica M. Weis, an American politician